The Citizens' Commission to Investigate the FBI was an activist group operational in the US during the early 1970s.  Their only known action was breaking into a two-man Media, Pennsylvania, office of the Federal Bureau of Investigation (FBI) and stealing over 1,000 classified documents.  They then mailed these documents anonymously to several US newspapers to expose numerous illegal FBI operations which were infringing on the First Amendment rights of American civilians.  Most news outlets initially refused to publish the information, saying it related to ongoing operations and that disclosure might have threatened the lives of agents or informants.  However, The Washington Post, after affirming the veracity of the files which the Commission sent them, ran a front-page story on March 24, 1971, at which point other media organizations followed suit. 
"The complete collection of political documents ripped off from the F.B.I. office in Media, Pa., March 8, 1971" was published for the first time as the March 1972 issue of WIN Magazine, a journal associated with the War Resisters League. The documents revealed the COINTELPRO operation, and led to the Church Committee and the cessation of this operation by the FBI. Noam Chomsky has stated:

According to its analysis of the documents in this FBI office, 1 percent were devoted to organized crime, mostly gambling; 30 percent were "manuals, routine forms, and similar procedural matter"; 40 percent were devoted to political surveillance and the like, including two cases involving right-wing groups, ten concerning immigrants, and over 200 on left or liberal groups. Another 14 percent of the documents concerned draft resistance and "leaving the military without government permission." The remainder concerned bank robberies, murder, rape, and interstate theft.

The theft resulted in the exposure of some of the FBI's most self-incriminating documents, including several documents detailing the FBI's use of postal workers, switchboard operators, etc., in order to spy on black college students and various non-violent black activist groups.

Some 40 years after their successful infiltration, some of the perpetrators decided to go public. In 2014, Betty Medsger's book The Burglary: The Discovery of J. Edgar Hoover's Secret F.B.I. was released, which contains the burglars' description of the burglary and revealed the identities of five of the eight burglars.  Filmmaker Johanna Hamilton also made a documentary titled 1971 (2014).

Members 
On March 11, 1976, the FBI closed their investigation of the group's burglary without conclusively identifying any of the perpetrators. The members' identities remained a secret until early 2014, when all seven of the eight who could be found agreed to be interviewed by journalist Betty Medsger, who was writing a nonfiction book on the event: The Burglary.

Of these seven, five agreed to be publicly identified: Keith Forsyth, Bonnie Raines, Bonnie's husband John C. Raines (who, 10 years prior to the burglary, was a member of the Freedom Riders), and Robert "Bob" Williamson; the mastermind and recruiter, William C. Davidon, died in 2013 before the book was published but had planned to reveal his involvement, as well. The other two burglars who were interviewed for the hardcover edition chose to be identified by the pseudonyms "Susan Smith" and "Ron Durst". On March 7, 2021, in recognition of the 50th anniversary of the burglary, Ralph Daniel of San Rafael, Calif., revealed himself to be one of the burglars.

The final burglar, Judi Feingold, had, unlike the others, fled across the country in 1971 and could not be found for 43 years. When she discovered that the other burglars were breaking their silence, she contacted Robert Williamson and eventually was interviewed by Medsger as well, which was included in the epilogue to the paperback edition of The Burglary.

Several months after the burglary, Forsyth and Williamson were also members of The Camden 28, a separate activist group which broke into a draft board to destroy documents, in order to impede the war draft and make an anti-war statement.

Burglary

The burglars did extensive surveillance of the FBI office, to ensure they knew when the office was empty and when the streets were unlikely to have police patrols. The break-in was perpetrated on the day of Joe Frazier and Muhammad Ali's Fight of the Century. The burglars confirmed in subsequent interviews this was done in the hope that the building manager and the residents upstairs would be glued to their radios to hear the summaries of the fight. While the contracts for the Fight of the Century forbade any live television or radio coverage, there were summaries after each round on the Mutual Broadcasting System on the night of the fight available to the public. Ali was himself a COINTELPRO target due to his involvement with the Nation of Islam and the anti-war movement.

The picture of the office shown in The New York Times video corresponds to 1 Veterans Sq, Media, PA.

Statement
In a 2014 interview, John Raines said that while returning from the burglary early in the morning, the group had stopped at a pay phone, called a Reuters journalist, and delivered the following statement:

On the night of March 8, 1971, the Citizens' Commission to Investigate the FBI removed files from the Media, Pennsylvania, office of the FBI. These files will now be studied to determine: one, the nature and extent of surveillance and intimidation carried on by this office of the FBI, particularly against groups and individuals working for a more just, humane and peaceful society. Two, to determine how much of the FBI's efforts are spent on relatively minor crimes by the poor and the powerless against whom they can get a more glamorous conviction rate. Instead of investigating truly serious crimes by those with money and influence which cause great damage to the lives of many people—crimes such as war profiteering, monopolistic practices, institutional racism, organized crime, and the mass distribution of lethal drugs. Finally, three, the extent of illegal practices by the FBI, such as eavesdropping, entrapment, and the use of provocateurs and informers.

As this study proceeds, the results obtained along with the FBI documents pertaining to them will be sent to people in public life who have demonstrated the integrity, courage and commitment to democratic values which are necessary to effectively challenge the repressive policies of the FBI.

As long as the United States government wages war against Indochina in defiance of the vast majority who want all troops and weapons withdrawn this year, and extends that war and suffering under the guise of reducing it. As long as great economic and political power remains concentrated in the hands of a small clique not subject to democratic scrutiny and control. Then repression, intimidation, and entrapment are to be expected. We do not believe that this destruction of democracy and democratic society results simply from the evilness, egoism or senility of some leaders. Rather, this destruction is the result of certain undemocratic social, economic and political institutions.

Investigation
The FBI had up to 200 agents working on this case, but it was never solved, and the investigation was closed when the five-year statute of limitations ran out.

The burglars who were considered suspects and who were interviewed by the FBI (including John Raines, Bob Williamson, and "Susan Smith") did not cooperate or confess. Bonnie Raines, despite being the only burglar for whom the FBI had an actual facial composite, was ironically never named as a suspect or interviewed by the FBI. Judi Feingold disappeared into hiding. The FBI intentionally avoided interviewing the leader of the burglars, Bill Davidon, because he was an unindicted co-conspirator in the unrelated Harrisburg Seven case.

Documentary films
A documentary film titled 1971 was produced by Big Mouth Productions and co-produced by Laura Poitras.  It had its world premiere at the Tribeca Film Festival on April 18, 2014.

Asher Smart released the short live-action film, The Media Heist, in 2018.

In fiction
This burglary is one of the historical events fictionalized by James Ellroy in his 2009 novel Blood's a Rover, the third part of his Underworld USA Trilogy.

See also
 Global surveillance disclosures, the 2013 whistleblowing leak by Edward Snowden
 New York Times Co. v. United States, the 1971 case regarding publication of the Pentagon Papers detailing US involvement in the Vietnam War

References

External links 
 1971 - A film by Johanna Hamilton - 2014 documentary about the Citizens' Commission to Investigate the FBI
 "The Greatest Heist You've Never Heard Of"- New York Times Retro Report
 Los Angeles Times - A break-in to end all break-ins
 From COINTELPRO to Snowden, the FBI Burglars Speak Out After 43 Years of Silence (Part 2)
 National Public Radio story The Secret Burglary That Exposed J. Edgar Hoover's FBI, audio; January 7, 2014
 The New York Times - Burglars Who Took On F.B.I. Abandon Shadows mini-documentary by Mark Mazzetti; January 7, 2014
 Democracy Now! interviews: 
"It Was Time to Do More Than Protest": Activists Admit to 1971 FBI Burglary That Exposed COINTELPRO (Part 1)
 WIN Magazine
 War Resisters League
 This Is Criminal Podcast #183 Breaking into the FBI
 FBI records of the burglary investigation

Federal Bureau of Investigation controversies
American whistleblowers
Whistleblower support organizations
1971 in Pennsylvania
News leaks